Martin Junaković (born 16 February 1994) is a Croatian professional basketball player who last played for Boulazac of the LNB Pro B.

He won the ABA League championship in 2014, as a member of Cibona.

Club career
He started career in hometown club KK Šibenik  in 2009, but next year he left club and signed with Cedevita Zagreb. In 2013 he returned to Šibenik at the second time. He was one of the best player in Šibenik and played starting five. In 2015 he left club and signed with KK Zagreb. He had a great start to the 2017–18 A-1 League season, averaging 29.3 points and 7.3 assists for Zagreb. He left Zagreb in the end of December 2017, and on 3 January 2018 he signed with Macedonian First League team AV Ohrid. After short time, he signed with Bosnian-Herzegovinian team HKK Široki, but in July 2018 he left club and signed with GKK Šibenik at the third time, but he left Šibenik on 21 December 2018, because of club problems with finance and went to Lithuania, signed with BC Nevėžis.

Personal life
Junaković is close friends with Croatian basketball player Dario Šarić. On 29 June 2019 he married his girlfriend Matea Žižić.

References

External links
Martin Junaković at realgm.com
ABA League profile
FIBA Europe profile

1994 births
Living people
Croatian men's basketball players
Point guards
Basketball players from Šibenik
GKK Šibenik players
KK Šibenik players
KK Cedevita players
KK Cibona players
KK Kaštela players
KK Zagreb players
HKK Široki players
KK Zadar players
BC Nevėžis players